Vladimir Stanojević (born 1 May 1990) is a Serbian football defender.

References

External links
 
 Vladimir Stanojević stats at utakmica.rs 
 

1990 births
Living people
Footballers from Belgrade
Association football defenders
Serbian footballers
FK Čukarički players
FK Banat Zrenjanin players
FK Smederevo players
FK Bežanija players
FK Sinđelić Beograd players
Serbian SuperLiga players